Samuel Oliver may refer to:

 S. Addison Oliver (1833–1912), American pioneer, lawyer, judge and politician
 Samuel Pasfield Oliver (1838–1907), English artillery officer, geographer and antiquary
 Samuel W. Oliver (fl. 1829–1837), Alabama politician and Speaker of the Alabama House of Representatives; see 1837 Alabama gubernatorial election